Matsuhisa may refer to
Matsuhisa Station, a railway station in Misato, Saitama, Japan
, Japanese Olympic gymnast
, Japanese celebrity chef and restaurateur

Japanese-language surnames